Stephen Roderick Hill (born 15 March 1946). was Professor of Management at the University of London from 2001–11. He was also Principal of Royal Holloway College, University of London (RHC) from 2001-2009.

Education
He was educated at University College School. He then obtained a BA in Modern History at Balliol College, Oxford. He was later awarded an MSc in Sociology at the London School of Economics (LSE) followed in 1973 by a PhD.

Career
He has held various position in Sociology and Industrial Relations at Bedford College, University of London (1968–70) and the LSE from 1971 where he was Professor of Sociology from 1991–2001 and Professor of Management (2001–02). Hill was chief editor of the British Journal of Sociology for seven years, until 2003.

Personal life
In 1970, he married Jane Severn and they had one son and one daughter. The marriage was dissolved in 1993. In 1996, he married Siobhan Rosser.

References

1946 births
Academics of Royal Holloway, University of London
People educated at University College School
Living people
Alumni of Balliol College, Oxford
Alumni of the London School of Economics
Academics of Bedford College, London
Academics of the London School of Economics
Academic journal editors